Henry Wilson Lander (November 8, 1826 – January 14, 1904) was an American lawyer and politician.

Born in Brighton, Maine, Lander moved to Juneau, Wisconsin in 1849. In 1852, he then moved to Beaver Dam, Wisconsin where he practiced law. He served as mayor of Beaver Dam. Lander also served in the Wisconsin State Senate in 1868 and 1869. He also served as Dodge County district attorney, United States court commissioner, and Wisconsin Circuit Court commissioner. He died of pneumonia in Beaver Dam, Wisconsin.

References

External links

1826 births
1904 deaths
People from Somerset County, Maine
Politicians from Beaver Dam, Wisconsin
Wisconsin lawyers
County officials in Wisconsin
Mayors of places in Wisconsin
Wisconsin state senators
People from Juneau, Wisconsin
19th-century American politicians